The Bardhaman–Asansol section is a railway line connecting  and . This  track is part of the Howrah–Delhi main line, Howrah–Gaya–Delhi line and Howrah–Allahabad–Mumbai line. It is under the jurisdiction of Eastern Railway, and is connected to the South Eastern Railway through Asansol–Adra line at Asansol Jn and Kalipahari–Damodar connector at Kalipahari (this line is only used by freight trains).

History

Beginning of railways in Eastern India
The Howrah–Delhi railway line was planned via Rajmahal, using the level plains on the banks of the Ganges. During the middle of the nineteenth century coal mining had started in the Raniganj Coalfield. The coal was being mined by Carr, Tagore and Company owned primarily by Prince Dwarakanath Tagore, and was transported in boats and barges on the Damodar River from Narayankuri ghat. The fluctuating levels of water in the Damodar was an impediment for the smooth transportation of coal.

Amongst the Indian merchants, in Mumbai and Kolkata, who took an active interest in the development of the railways, the most prominent name was that of Dwarakanath. M/s Carr, Tagore and Company is reported to have offered in 1844, to raise some capital for the construction of a railway line beyond Bardhaman to the Raniganj Coalfield. However, after Dwarakanath's premature death the conception, promotion and launching of India's railways were all British.  
The railways were extended to Asansol in July 1863.

What was then the BNR mainline from Nagpur to Asansol was opened for goods traffic in 1891.

The "main line"
The first rail track between Howrah and Delhi was via what was later named as Sahibganj loop and the first train on the route was run in 1864. A "shorter main line" connecting Raniganj and Kiul Junction was in position in 1871 and the opening of the Grand Chord in 1907 shortened the distance from Howrah to Delhi even further.

The Andal–Sainthia branch line was built in 1913. The  branch line linked the north-eastern part of Raniganj coalfield and the western part of Birbhum district to the main railway tracks.

MEMU service
The first MEMU service on the Bardhaman–Asansol section was started on 11 July 1994.

Electrification
The Bardhaman–Mankar sector was electrified in 1964–65, the Mankar–Waria sector in 1965–66 and the Waria–Asansol sector in 1960−61.

Loco sheds
There are diesel loco sheds at Bardhaman and Andal. Bardhaman diesel loco shed has WDG-3A, WDM-6, WDM-2 and WDM-3A locos. EMUs are also parked here. Andal diesel loco shed has WDS-6, WDM-2, WDM-3A and WDG-3A locos.  Asansol had the oldest electric loco shed of Indian Railways. It presently has WAG-5 and WAM-4 locos.

Andal Yard
The Andal Yard is the largest goods yard in the Asansol Division of Eastern Railway. Wagons are marshaled in the yard with the assistance of a hump fitted with mechanical retarders. Located in the Raniganj Coalfield, the yard handles about 1,300 coal wagons daily and another 4,400 wagons with other materials. Apart from coal, it handles steel, petroleum products and a large parcel traffic.

Speed limits
Most of the Bardhaman–Asansol section is classified as 'A' class line where trains can run up to 160 km per hour but in certain sections speeds may be limited to 120–130 km per hour.  The Howrah Rajdhani (between Howrah and New Delhi) travels at an average speed of 85.8 km per hour and the Sealdah Rajdhani (between Sealdah and New Delhi) travels at an average speed of 84.70 km per hour.

Busy section
It is one of the busiest sections of Indian Railways with Asansol handling over 50 trains in a day.

Railway reorganisation
In 1952, Eastern Railway, Northern Railway and North Eastern Railway were formed. Eastern Railway was formed with a portion of East Indian Railway Company, east of Mughalsarai and Bengal Nagpur Railway. Northern Railway was formed with a portion of East Indian Railway Company west of Mughalsarai, Jodhpur Railway, Bikaner Railway and Eastern Punjab Railway. North Eastern Railway was formed with Oudh and Tirhut Railway, Assam Railway and a portion of Bombay, Baroda and Central India Railway. East Central Railway was created in 1996–97.

References

|

5 ft 6 in gauge railways in India
Rail transport in West Bengal

Transport in Asansol

Transport in Purba Bardhaman district